Fort Ballance is a former coastal artillery battery on Point Gordon on Wellington's Miramar Peninsula.

Built in 1885 following fears of an impending war with Russia, Fort Ballance is one of the best preserved of a string of nineteenth century coastal fortifications constructed to protect New Zealand from naval attack. In 1885, the Government, reluctantly acknowledging that they could not rely solely on Britain for protection, commissioned engineer Major Henry Cautley to design a series of fortifications to protect the country's main ports. The Fortress is listed as a Category I Historic Place. Fort Ballance was the premier fort in the Wellington area for 26 years (1885-1911). Used by the military over a period of 60 years (1885-1945), the 1880s layout of Fort Ballance is largely unaltered and a good impression of the original nineteenth century fort remains. The fort is a permanent reminder of the technology used in the coastal defence network of the 1880s and it is an early example of the use of concrete as a building material.

Overview
Fort Ballance is the largest of the military installations located on the spur between Mahanga Bay and Scorching Bay. The other positions were known variously as Fort Gordon, the Spur Battery and the Low or Foreshore Battery. The ruins of these forts and batteries were partly buried about 1960.

The fort follows the topography of the spur and earthworks were used to build up the centre of the position where the command post and communications centre were located. Earthworks also provided protection for the barracks, ablution areas, magazines and stores to the rear of the gun pits.

The rear of the fort adjoining the accommodation casemates was enclosed by musketry parapets and loopholed walls, parts of which have been demolished.

Fort Ballance had positions for five main gun pits facing the channel. The concrete gun pits, some of which were closed and others open, are circular or semi-circular and while the guns have been removed the gun emplacements remain intact.

Fort Gordon, to the south of Fort Ballance, consisted of one gun-pit and magazines. It is now almost completely buried as are the smaller positions lower down the spur. Tunnel entrances have been filled in.

Additional firing support was located at Kau Point and Point Halswell, and the positions were protected from land attack by a further defence position on Mount Crawford.

Construction
Fort Ballance is an emplacement that can truly be called a 'fort', in that is it was a self-contained unit built to withstand an enemy attack from the land. Fort Ballance was built of timber, mortar and corrugated-iron sheets by former members of the armed constabulary and prison labour from Mount Crawford Gaol. During the 1890s the wooden construction was rebuilt with concrete.

Armaments

Fort Ballance
The main armament at Fort Ballance evolved over the years to include:

1885-1910:
Two Two Seven-inch R.M.L. guns
1886-1924
One One six-inch disappearing gun
1903-1924
One One six-inch disappearing gun, replaced one of the 7inch RML
1892-WW1
Two Q.F. Nordenfeldt six-pounder guns were mounted at the flank angles.

Fort Gordon
The main armament at Fort Gordon consisted of:
1895-1924
One One eight-inch disappearing gun
One QF 3-pounder Hotchkiss gun (Spur Battery)

Foreshore Batteries
The main armament of the Low Battery consisted of:
1891-1897
Two 64-Pounder RML
1897-1907
Two QF 6-pounder Hotchkiss, removed after WW1.

Gordon Point Battery
1901-1923
Two QF 12 pounders
1941-1959
Two BL 4 inch naval gun Mk VII guns
1942
Two Ordnance QF 18-pounder guns
1943-1944
Two 75 mm Gun M1917 guns
1944-1945
One twin QF 6 pounder 10 cwt gun

Ammunition Depot 
With the decommissioning of the guns of Fort Ballance in the immediate post-war years, Fort Ballance along with the Mahanga Bay facilities, Shelly Bay, Fort Gordon and the Kau Point Battery were taken over by the Ammunition Section of the New Zealand Army Ordnance Corps as the 1st large scale ammunition depot of the NZAOC until 1929 when purpose-built facilities were constructed at Hopuhopu Camp in the Waikato. The ammunition infrastructure at Fort Ballance and the surrounding area consisted of 19 magazines, one store and a laboratory and would remain in use until the early years of the Second World War.

Seesaw Searchlight

Below and to the east of the Fort was a "seesaw' searchlight, set up in 1891 and powered by the stream engine in Fort Ballance. The searchlight consisted of an electric carbon lamp, capable of a strong beam for target illumination, because the bulb was vulnerable to enemy fire, it was protected in a recessed emplacement whilst a large mirror, attached to the end of the ‘see-saw’ girder reflected the light beam across the water.

The Searchlight was able to illuminate targets from the harbour Heads to Ward Island with a power of 50000 candlepower.

Only a few of these were built anywhere in the Empire. It was difficult to operate and was never successful and the position was abandoned in 1899, but the emplacement remains today.

Fatal accidents
7 August 1899 whilst attempting to demolish the Seesaw emplacement three members of the permanent militia were killed and one injured in a Gun Cotton explosion.
 2 November 1904 whilst conducting live firing on a 12 pounder, there was a breech explosion in which one Gunner was killed and five Injured.

See also 

 Coastal fortifications of New Zealand

References

External links
Capital Defence
 Instructions for 6 inch Rifled Breech Loading Armstrong Gun and Hydro-Pneumatic Disappearing Carriage from Australian National Archives
Video clip showing left side view of restored disappearing gun at Taiaroa Head, New Zealand
Video clip showing breech operation and loading of restored disappearing gun at Taiaroa Head, New Zealand
Disappearing Mountings described  at Victorian Forts and Artillery website
Diagram of Armstrong Mk V gun on disappearing carriage
 Victorian Naval Forces manuals 1890 & 1895. Includes QF 6 pounder Nordenfelt details. From Friends of the Cerberus website
Nordenfelt 6 pdr Quick Firer History, technical details, animations

Buildings and structures in Wellington City
Heritage New Zealand Category 1 historic places in the Wellington Region
New Zealand Army
Ballance
1880s architecture in New Zealand
Coastal fortifications
Military installations established in 1885
Military installations closed in 1911
1885 establishments in New Zealand
1911 disestablishments in New Zealand